Sūryaprabha (literally "Sunlight", Chinese: 日光菩薩; pinyin: Rìguāng Púsà; Rōmaji: Nikkō Bosatsu) is a bodhisattva whose specialty is sunlight and good health. Sūryaprabha is often seen with Candraprabha, as the two siblings serve Bhaiṣajyaguru. Statues of the two closely resemble each other and are commonly found together, sometimes flanking temple doors. They are also recognized in mainland Asia as devas.

In Chinese folk religion, the solar god Taiyang Xingjun is depicted as his incarnation.

His sacred day is the first day of the second lunar month in the Chinese calendar.

See also 
 Index of Buddhism-related articles
 Secular Buddhism

References 

 Shinto and Buddhist Corner, accessed 20 May 2006

Bodhisattvas
Bhaiṣajyaguru Buddha
Twenty-Four Protective Deities
Solar gods